Nduka Ugbade (born 6 September 1969) is the head coach of the Nigeria under-17 national football team and a former football player.

Player
As a youth player, fresh from St. Finbarrs College Akoka-Lagos, Ugbade was captain of the Nigeria U-16 male soccer team that won the 1985 FIFA U-16 World Championship (later referred to as JVC/FIFA at the following edition after which it metamorphosed to its current name and status -Coca-Cola/FIFA U-17 WC). The event was held in China and brought Ugbade into prominence after Jonathan Akpoborie(5min) and Victor Igbinoba (80+min)scored unreplied goals for Nigeria against West Germany, securing what was Nigeria's and Africa's first major win in football on the global stage.

Four years later in the U-20 category, he was also part of Nigeria national under-20 football team at the 1989 FIFA World Youth Championship that placed second and won silver medals in Saudi Arabia. Nigeria lost to Portugal in the final match, but Ugbade and his teammates were the toast of the spectators after posting spectacular wins over hosts Saudi Arabia, highly favoured United States, and the USSR. Against the USSR the Nigerian team recovered from a 4-0 deficit to level 4-4 with Ugbade scoring the fourth before Nigeria won on penalties. This win is fondly referred to in Nigerian football history as the "Dammam Miracle".

After his immensely successful youth football career, Ugbade featured in the Nigerian national team for some years, but was plagued by injuries and poor form in the later years of his career which denied him of the opportunity of starring at the 1994 World Cup.

Clubs
1999-2002 Perak FA
1998-1999 Marine Castle United FC
1994-1997 Nigerdock Lagos
1994      Calabar Rovers
1992-1993 El-Kanemi Warriors
1991-1992 Real Avilés
1989-1991 CD Castellón
1989 El-Kanemi Warriors

Coaching career
In August 2011 he was appointed by the Nigeria Football Federation (NFF) to be one of the two assistant coaches for the Golden Eaglets (Nigeria under-17 national football team). In 2013, the team won the silver medal in the CAF U-17 tournament in Algeria, and won the 2013 FIFA U-17 World Cup in the UAE.

In 2013, Ugbade was named head coach of Lagos club MFM FC.

References

External links
 
 

1969 births
Living people
Sportspeople from Lagos
Nigerian footballers
Nigeria youth international footballers
Nigeria under-20 international footballers
Nigeria international footballers
CD Castellón footballers
El-Kanemi Warriors F.C. players
Real Avilés CF footballers
Calabar Rovers F.C. players
Bnei Yehuda Tel Aviv F.C. players
Perak F.C. players
Africa Cup of Nations-winning players
1992 African Cup of Nations players
1994 African Cup of Nations players
La Liga players
Segunda División players
Israeli Premier League players
Nigerian expatriate footballers
Expatriate footballers in Spain
Expatriate footballers in Israel
Expatriate footballers in Malaysia
Nigerian expatriate sportspeople in Spain
Nigerian expatriate sportspeople in Israel
Nigerian expatriate sportspeople in Malaysia
Association football defenders